Marcel Rominger (born 27 September 1978) is an American classical pianist.  He formerly taught classes at the Staten Island Conservatory of Music as well as Baruch College.

Early life to present
Son of a Swiss father and a Brazilian mother, Marcel developed an interest in piano as early as age 5, when he was first exposed to the works of composers like Mozart and Beethoven.  He proceeded to obtain a Bachelor of Music Degree in Music Education and Piano Performance from the Crane School of Music at SUNY in Potsdam. Among those who instructed him are Olga Gross and Paul Wyse. He pursued higher education and obtained his Masters of Music from UA while studying under Russian concert pianist Jura Margulis, where he held an assistantship in accompanying. He later studied with Hugo Goldenzweig at Mannes College of Music and has also been coached by Seymour Bernstein and Leslie Howard.

Awards and recognition

Winner of the 2001-2002 Crane Concerto Competition
Winner of 2002-2003 North Arkansas Symphony Orchestra Concerto / Aria Competition
2003 MTNA Arkansas State Winner of the Young Artist Category
2005 Honorable Mention at the William Garrison Competition in Baltimore Maryland
Recipient of the Rose L. Greenblatt Award in Piano
Recent recipient of the CUNY Chancellor's Fellowship Award

Discography
"Marcel Rominger" - (self-titled) featuring the works of J.S. Bach; L.v. Beethoven; F. Liszt; S. Prokofiev (composers)

Track Listing
1. Prelude  
2. Allemande  
3. Courante  
4. Sarabande  
5. Gavotte I-II  
6. Gigue  
7. Allegro Assai
8. Andante con moto  
9. Allegro ma non troppo  
10. Waldesrauschen  
11. Gnomenreigen  
12. Sonata No. 3 in A minor, Op 28

See also
List of classical music composers

References

Marcel Rominger Webpage
Staten Island Conservatory of Music Faculty Page
SILive.com article

American classical pianists
Male classical pianists
American male pianists
Crane School of Music alumni
Living people
1978 births
Baruch College faculty
Mannes School of Music alumni
21st-century classical pianists
21st-century American male musicians
21st-century American pianists